Byron Giles Rogers (August 1, 1900 – December 31, 1983) was an American politician from Colorado.

Early life
Rogers was the son of Peter and Minnie May Rogers. Born in Greenville, Texas, he moved with his parents to Oklahoma in April 1902. He attended the public schools of Checotah, Oklahoma. During the First World War, he served as a private in the Infantry, United States Army. He attended the University of Arkansas in 1918, the University of Oklahoma from 1919 to 1922, and the University of Colorado in 1923 and 1924. He earned his LL.B. at Sturm College of Law, University of Denver, 1925, and commenced the practice of law in Las Animas, Colorado.

He married his secretary, Helen Kepler, in 1933, and they had two children, Shirley and Byron Jr.

Legal career
Rogers served as city attorney of Las Animas from 1929 to 1933. He was a member of the Colorado House of Representatives from 1932 to 1935, serving as speaker in 1933. He served as county attorney of Bent County, Colorado, in 1933, and was later on the legal staff of Agricultural Adjustment Administration and National Recovery Administration, Washington, D.C., in 1933 and 1934. He served as assistant United States Attorney for Colorado 1934–1936, and Attorney General of Colorado 1936–1941. He was a public member of the War Labor Board from 1942 to 1945.

Congressional career
Rogers was elected as a Democrat to the Eighty-second and to the ten succeeding Congresses (January 3, 1951 – January 3, 1971). In 1970, due to his support of the Vietnam War, he was challenged in the primary by attorney Craig Barnes. Barnes, a tall, well-groomed, politically astute 42-year old attorney, stood in marked contrast to 70-year old Rogers. Barnes ran an aggressive campaign, attacking Rogers on many issues, including the war, and actively recruited new, young voters. In the primary, Barnes would defeat Rogers by a mere 30 votes (27,218 to 27,188). Rogers alleged foul that Barnes' staff had registered University of Denver students who were non-residents from other states.

Had Barnes won, Rogers planned to challenge the general election in the House, however, instead many of Rogers' supporters, especially in Northwest Denver, bolted to the Republican candidate, Mike McKevitt, who would defeat Barnes by more than 10,000 votes.

Rogers was a resident of Denver, Colorado until his death there December 31, 1983. He was interred in Mount Lindo Cemetery near Tiny Town, Colorado.

The Byron G. Rogers Federal Building and United States Courthouse was named in his honor in 1984.

He voted in favor of the Civil Rights Act of 1957.

References

  Retrieved on 2009-02-20

External links
 

1900 births
1983 deaths
Colorado Attorneys General
District attorneys in Colorado
Assistant United States Attorneys
People from Greenville, Texas
People from Las Animas, Colorado
Politicians from Denver
Sturm College of Law alumni
Democratic Party members of the Colorado House of Representatives
Democratic Party members of the United States House of Representatives from Colorado
Speakers of the Colorado House of Representatives
United States Army soldiers
United States Army personnel of World War I
20th-century American lawyers
20th-century American politicians